David Joseph Henry is a writer, human rights activist and former parliamentary candidate from Manchester, England.
He is a former pupil of Oakwood High School in Chorlton.

Biography
In 1999 he co-founded the Queer Youth Network.  	

He writes a regular column in London's QX magazine , and has been a contributor to the Pink Paper and OutNorthWest. David has been outspoken in the media and petitioned the government on the issue of civil partnerships and has argued that they "create a two-tier system of inequality".

In June 2009 he attempted to perform a citizen's arrest on Salford MP Hazel Blears at a constituency party meeting in Swinton.

He was selected to contest the Salford and Eccles seat at the 2010 general election, beating presumptive nominee Merseyside TUC leader Alec McFadden by a majority vote after responding to Martin Bell's call for a "community champion" during a public meeting in Eccles. He received 730 votes and Hazel Blears received 16,655. Despite the distribution of votes, David's campaign generated notable media interest. He was shadowed by a film crew and was the focus of the 30-minute documentary film The Candidate which premièred on Channel M. Described as an "intimate and amusing portrait". It has since been shown at a number of film festivals and has received acclaim after being nominated for the Royal Television Society Awards, Exposures 2001 and the Salford International Film Festival.

References

See also
List of articles related to youth rights

English LGBT rights activists
English LGBT writers
Writers from Manchester
English human rights activists
Year of birth missing (living people)
Living people
Politicians from Manchester
21st-century LGBT people